Lisa Adeline Mainiero (born January 18, 1957) is an American writer and academic in the field of management. Her career focuses on the careers of women and men, and workplace romance. Mainiero is one of the first researchers to investigate romance in the workplace, and crafted the Kaleidoscope Career Model (the KCM) with her co-author Sherry E. Sullivan.

Education 
Mainiero completed a doctorate in organizational behavior from Yale University.  In 1983, Maniero completed her dissertation titled Coping With Powerlessness: Power Balancing Strategies Employed by Men and Women Under Conditions of Related Dependency in Organizational Settings. J. Richard Hackman was the chair of her dissertation committee along with members, Rosabeth Moss Kanter, and Martha Glenn Cox. She also worked with Victor Vroom on a pre-dissertation project.

Career 
Mainiero is a Full Professor of Management at Fairfield University Dolan School of Business. Her research focuses on women in management, career paths for women and men, gender and diversity, workplace romance, and sexual harassment issues. Mainiero is one of the first researchers to investigate romance in the workplace. She is also well known for her career model, the Kaleidoscope Career Model (the KCM), co-authored with Sherry E Sullivan, which describes the parameters of authenticity, balance, and challenge for women and for men as they move through their careers. She has appeared on Good Morning America, The Oprah Winfrey Show, CNN, Fox News with Neal Cavuto, Larry King Live and numerous other television talk shows and programs. She is frequently contacted by journalists all over the world for her expertise and has been noted as a source in The New York Times, USA Today, Time Magazine, Business Week, and many other publications. She served on the editorial board for the Academy of Management Perspectives journal and was division and program chair of the Woman in Management division, now the Gender and Diversity division of the Academy of Management.

Selected works

Books

Articles 

 
Mainiero, L.A. & Sullivan, S.E. (2005). "Kaleidoscope Careers: An Alternate Explanation for the 'Opt-Out' Revolution." The Academy of Management, 19(1), 106-123.
Mainiero, L.A. & Jones, K.J. (2013). “Sexual Harassment Versus Workplace Romance: Social Media Spillover and Textual Harassment in the Workplace.” The Academy of Management  Perspectives, 27(3), 1-17.
Mainiero, L.A. & Gibson, D.E. (2017). "The Kaleidoscope Career Model Revisited: How Midcareer Men and Women Diverge on Authenticity, Balance and Challenge." Journal of Career Development, 45(4), 361-377. https://doi.org/10.1177/0894845317698223
Mainiero, L.A. & Gibson, D.E. (2003). "Managing Employee Trauma: Dealing with the Emotional Fallout from 9-11." Academy of Management Executive, 17(3), 130-143.
Mainiero, L.A. & Jones, K.J. (2012). “Developing a Communication Ethics Model to Address Potential  Sexual Harassment from Inappropriate Social Media Contacts Between Coworkers.” Journal of  Business Ethics, 114(2), 367-379. DOI 10.1007/s10551-012-1349-8

References 

20th-century American non-fiction writers
20th-century American women writers
21st-century American non-fiction writers
21st-century American women writers
American business writers
Women business writers
American women non-fiction writers
American women in business
American women academics
American management consultants
Fairfield University faculty
Yale University alumni
1957 births
Living people